Marest is a commune in the Pas-de-Calais department in the Hauts-de-France region of France.

Geography

Population

Places of interest
 The church of St.Vaast, dating from the seventeenth century.
 An eighteenth-century windmill.

See also
Communes of the Pas-de-Calais department

References

Communes of Pas-de-Calais